Kortne Thompson-Ford (born January 26, 1996) is an American professional soccer player who plays as a center-back for Sporting Kansas City in Major League Soccer.

Early life
Kortne Ford spent his early life in Olathe, Kansas where he made the Kansas City Wizards academy team. In 2008, he moved with his mother to Colorado at the age of 12.

Career

College
Ford played three years of college soccer at the University of Denver between 2014 and 2016. In his three seasons at the University of Denver, Ford was a two-time All-Summit League First Team selection and was a Top Drawer Soccer Second Team All-America in 2016.

Professional
Ford signed a homegrown player deal with Colorado Rapids on January 6, 2017. He made his professional debut on April 9, 2017, playing 83-minutes in a 3–1 loss to Sporting Kansas City. He scored his first professional goal on May 27, 2017, also against Sporting Kansas City, in a 1–0 victory for the Rapids.

Ford played every minute of Colorado's Concacaf Champions League games against Toronto FC in February 2018. On March 3, Ford suffered a sprained MCL in his left knee. Ford returned to action on July 1, playing 29 minutes in a 1-0 win at Vancouver Whitecaps FC. Ford started the next 12 MLS matches for Colorado, finishing the season with 1,141 minutes across 15 appearances.

Ford did not appear in 2019 and underwent successful knee surgery on July 21, 2019. Ford did not appear in 2020 and underwent successful knee surgery on Aug. 25.

Ford was loaned to San Antonio FC on August 19, 2021. 1,042 days after his last professional appearance, Ford made his debut for San Antonio on August 21, 2021.

On January 14, 2022, it was announced Ford would be signing with Sporting Kansas City on a one-year deal with the option to extend into the 2023 and 2024 seasons.

On July 15, 2022, Ford was suspended ten games and fined twenty percent of his annual salary after testing positive for a performance-enhancing substance.

Career statistics

Club

References

External links
 
 Denver profile
 

Living people
1996 births
American soccer players
Soccer players from Kansas
Sportspeople from Olathe, Kansas
Association football central defenders
Denver Pioneers men's soccer players
Colorado Rapids players
Major League Soccer players
Soccer players from Colorado
People from Greeley, Colorado
Homegrown Players (MLS)
Sporting Kansas City players